Katholischer Friedhof Köln-Mülheim  is a cemetery in Cologne, Germany. The oldest gravestone dates to 1841.

References

External links
 

Cemeteries in Cologne
Roman Catholic cemeteries